Starting Point is a 2015 Polish short-documentary film about a woman, Aneta, who was sentenced to prison at age of 19 for murder. After nine years she began working as a carer for elderly and met Helena who diagnosed with rheumatism. Starting Point was shortlisted with ten other documentaries from 74 entries submitted to 88th Academy Awards in Documentary Short Subject category. The final five nominations were scheduled to be announced on January 14, 2016.

Synopsis
Aneta 'rebelled to the max' at the age of nineteen and wound up in prison for murder. Nine years later, her daily routine takes her from behind the walls of the prison to a care home for the elderly. One of the residents, Helena, has been ill ever since infancy. She is fascinated by the phenomenon which is Aneta. In her opinion, the young woman has everything she could want for. And so Helena, whose knowledge of the world has come “from the windows of hospitals and coaches”, avidly asks Aneta about her life. A test awaits Aneta... and help will come from Helena.

Awards
 Short Documentary Award - 2015 Sheffield Doc/Fest 
 Golden Frog Grand Prix for Short Documentary - 22nd IFF Camerimage 
 Doc/Short Main Prize - Docudays UA Ukrain 2015
 33rd Młodzi i Film Festival - Best Documentary Short
 2015 Documenta Madrid Festival

References

External links
 
 
 

2015 films
2015 short documentary films
Documentary films about veterans
Polish short documentary films